Clouston Creek is a stream in Alberta, Canada.

Clouston Creek has the name of N. S. Clouston, member of a surveying party.

See also
List of rivers of Alberta

References

Rivers of Alberta